Acridoschema ligatum is a species of beetle in the family Cerambycidae. It was described by Quedenfeldt in 1882.

References

Acmocerini
Beetles described in 1882